John Briscoe (July 30, 1948 – November 12, 2014) was a South African-born environmental engineer who was Visiting Professor of the Practice of Environmental Health in the Department of Environmental Health at Harvard School of Public Health. He was known as "Mr. Water" to environmental economists.  At Harvard, Briscoe also held appointments at the Harvard School of Engineering and Applied Sciences (SEAS) as Gordon McKay Professor of the Practice of Environmental Engineering, and at the Harvard Kennedy School.  His career focused on efforts on the developing world to successfully manage and preserve water as a precious resource.  In early 2014, he received the Stockholm Water Prize - the “Nobel Prize of Water" - for "unparalleled contributions to global and local management of water - contributions covering vast thematic, geographic, and institutional environments-that have improved the lives and livelihoods of millions of people worldwide.”

He spoke English, Afrikaans, Bengali, Portuguese, and Spanish.

Chronology
 1948 - Born in South Africa
 1969 - B.Sc., Civil Engineering, University of Cape Town, Cape Town, South Africa
 1976 - Ph.D., Environmental Engineering, Harvard University
 Government water agencies of South Africa and Mozambique, Engineer
 Cholera Research Center, now ICDDR,B, Bangladesh, Epidemiologist
 University of North Carolina, Professor of Water Resources
 1989-2009 - World Bank (20 years): He helped oversee projects in water resources, irrigation, hydropower, and sanitation at the World Bank and consulted on water issues for nonprofits, governments, nongovernmental organizations, and businesses
 1989-2009 - World Bank, country director for Brazil: Briscoe’s role in affecting the evolution of the World Bank was the subject of Chapter 13 in Sebastian Mallaby’s definitive history, “The World’s Banker,” Penguin 2006.
 2009-2014 - Professor of Environmental Health, Harvard School of Public Health, Boston, MA
 2014 - Stockholm Water Prize - "Nobel Prize of Water”

Early life
John Briscoe was born in, and grew up in, South Africa.  His mother Thelma ran a day-care center and orphanage in the black township of Soweto.  His nation's extremes of poverty and wealth were seen in the social and ecological landscape, the lush coastal regions contrasted with the dry but economically important interior, where massive mineral mining operations were carried out.  He described realizing that understanding water was fundamental to understanding the development of South African resources and the many social and economic inequalities of the continent. He continued developing these views while living in the interior of Bangladesh, where he witnessed how water projects and flood-protection and electrification could improve human lives greatly.  He spent the rest of his career controlling water, whether for environmental or human purposes, and crusading.

A native of South Africa, John earned a bachelor's degree in civil engineeringat the University of Cape Town in 1969, an M.S. in environmental engineering in 1972, and a Ph.D. in environmental engineering at Harvard University in 1976. Before coming to Harvard, he worked as an engineer in the government water agencies of South Africa and Mozambique; an epidemiologist at the Cholera Research Center, now ICDDR,B in Bangladesh; a professor of water resources at the University of North Carolina; and, for 20 years, at the World Bank, where he helped oversee projects in water resources, irrigation, hydropower, and sanitation. He has consulted on water issues for nonprofits, governments, nongovernmental organizations, and businesses.

At Harvard, John launched the university-wide Harvard Water Security Initiative, which focuses on major challenges in countries around the world, including the ability to provide people with safe drinking water and food, to produce energy and sustain economic growth, and to enhance environmental quality. He taught popular undergraduate and graduate courses on water and was nominated for major teaching and mentoring awards. In addition, he led groups of students from across the university in collaborative research on water management in the Colorado, Indus, Mississippi, Murray-Darling, and Sao Francisco basins.

Education
 1965:        Matriculated at St Patrick’s Christian Brothers’ College Kimberley [Christian Brothers’ College]
 1965-1969:   B.Sc (first class honours) in Civil Engineering, University of Cape Town, Cape Town, South Africa, conferred 1969
 1970-1972:   M.S. in Environmental Engineering, Harvard University, conferred 1972
 1972-1976:   Ph.D. in Environmental Engineering, Harvard University, conferred 1976
 Major field: Water Resources Engineering; Minor fields: economics and demography
 1993:        Leadership Course at Center for Creative Leadership, Greensboro, North Carolina
 1998:        Executive Development Program—Harvard and Stanford Graduate Schools of Business

Publications
John Briscoe has published widely in journals from many disciplines, including public health, nutrition, epidemiology, water resources, demography, anthropology, political science and economics.  His publications include over 120 articles in refereed professional journals and eight books:

Briscoe, John, Richard G. Feachem and Mujibur M. Rahaman, Evaluating Health Impact: Water Supply, Sanitation and Hygiene Education, IDRC Press, Ottawa, Canada, 80 pages, 1986.
 Briscoe, John and David de Ferranti, Water for Rural Communities: Helping People Help Themselves, World Bank, Washington DC, 32 pages, 1988.
 John Briscoe, Brazil: The New Challenge of Adult Health, World Bank, Washington DC, 133 pages, 1990 (in English and Portuguese). (Brazil/World Bank Country Partnership Strategy)
 The World Bank (Main author), The Water Strategy of the World Bank, Washington DC, February 2003.
 John Briscoe and RPS Malik, India’s Water Economy: Bracing for a Turbulent Future.  Oxford University Press, 2006.
 John Briscoe and RPS Malik (editors), Handbook on Water Resources Development and Management in India, Oxford University Press, 2007.
 John Briscoe and Usman Qamar, Pakistan’s Water Economy: Running Dry, Oxford University Press, 2007.
 The World Bank (Main author), Country Partnership Strategy for Brazil, 2007-2010, Washington DC, 2007. (World Bank's Water Sector Strategy)

Service
 Served on the Water Science and Technology Board of the National Academy of Sciences
 Founding member of the major global water partnerships
World Water Council
Global Water Partnership
World Commission on Dams
 Global Agenda Council, World Economic Forum
 High-Level Advisory Committee, Murray Darling Basin Authority
 Council Member, Distinguished Water Professionals, International Water Association
 Senior Water Advisor, McKinsey and Company

Consultancies
 World Bank
 Asian Development Bank
 US National Intelligence Council
 National Water Commission of Australia

Awards
 1965: Alan Spiers Memorial Bursary
 1965: Max Michaelis Scholarship
 1965: Barney Barnato Scholarship
 1966-69: Electricity Supply Commission Bursary
 1967: University Medal in Mathematics
 1968: University Medals in Hydraulics, Hydrology, Transportation, Highways, Soil Mechanics and Thesis
 1968: City of Cape Town Gold Medal as Best Graduating Engineering Student at the University
 1968: South African Steel Institute Award for Best Structural Design
 1968: E. Oliver Ashe Scholarship for Post-Graduate Study
 1968: Cape Town City Scholarship for Post-Graduate Study

Harvard University:
 1970-74: Harvard University Fellowship
 1974: Clemons Herschel Prize (awarded annually to the outstanding graduating student in Environmental Engineering)
 As an employee of the World Bank was prohibited from receiving awards.  Since leaving the World Bank has:
 Been Nominated by Harvard University students for Harvard's Joseph Levenson Award to recognize exceptional teaching of undergraduates
 Received the Grande Medalha de Inconfidencia, one of Brazil’s highest civilian honors (2009).
 2009: International Water Association, The President’s Award

 2009: Grande Medalha da Inconfidência, one of Brazil’s highest awards
 Stroud Prize for Excellence in Water
 Hauser Grant for Innovation in Learning and Teaching, Harvard University
 2014: Stockholm Water Prize - "Nobel Prize of Water”

Death
Briscoe died at age 66 after a -year struggle with cancer.

References

Further reading
 2009 profile in Harvard Public Health Review, “Briscoe has studied water from every conceivable angle: how it’s captured, contaminated, diverted, dammed, piped, poeticized, regulated, ritualized, squandered, sanitized, fished, and fought over.” Former HSPH Dean Barry Bloom said to many economists, John was “Mr. Water: the most far-sighted, thoughtful, deeply thinking person in the field.”
 2012 profile in Harvard Magazine, “The Water Tamer: John Briscoe tackles water insecurity around the world”
 HSPH Faculty profile, Department of Environmental Health
 Sebastian Mallaby, “The World’s Banker” (Chapter 13), Penguin 2006: Briscoe’s role in the evolution of the World Bank was the subject of Chapter 13.

External links
 Adam Bernstein, John Briscoe, a water-resource expert who championed dams, dies at 66, Washington Post: Obituaries, November 17, 2014, accessed 11/19/2014
 Harvard Magazine, 11/18/2014, John Briscoe, 66, Was Leading Water Security Expert, accessed 11/19/2014
 The Water Network, John Briscoe - winner water's Noble Dies, Posted by Water Network Research on 19 Nov 2014 at 04:43
 Julio Frenk, MD, PhD, HSPH Dean, In memoriam: John Briscoe, water resources expert, November 19, 2014, accessed 11/19/2014

1948 births
2014 deaths
Harvard School of Public Health faculty
John A. Paulson School of Engineering and Applied Sciences faculty
South African epidemiologists
World Bank people
Water resource management in South Africa
Harvard School of Engineering and Applied Sciences alumni
University of North Carolina at Chapel Hill faculty
Harvard Kennedy School faculty
South African officials of the United Nations